Mohammad Ayaz (born 13 October 1987) is a Pakistani-born cricketer who plays for the United Arab Emirates national cricket team. Ayaz is a left-handed batsman and left arm fast bowler.

Career
He made his first-class debut for Rawalpindi on 21 October 2007 in the 2007–08 Quaid-e-Azam Trophy in Pakistan. By December 2011, he played in another thirteen first-class matches and two List A matches in Pakistan.

Since 2015, he has represented the United Arab Emirates. He played in a twenty-over match against an England XI side in November 2015, during England's tour of the UAE. In January 2020, he was added to the UAE's One Day International (ODI) squad for the 2020 Oman Tri-Nation Series. In February 2020, he was named in the UAE's Twenty20 International (T20I) squad for the 2020 ACC Western Region T20 qualifier tournament. He made his T20I debut for the UAE, against Saudi Arabia, on 25 February 2020.

References

External links
 

1987 births
Living people
Emirati cricketers
United Arab Emirates Twenty20 International cricketers
Rawalpindi cricketers
Rawalpindi Rams cricketers
People from Jhelum
Pakistani emigrants to the United Arab Emirates
Pakistani expatriate sportspeople in the United Arab Emirates